is a freight terminal on the Kagoshima Main Line in Kokurakita-ku, Kitakyūshū, Japan, operated by Japan Freight Railway Company (JR Freight). Presently it handles no trains.

History
The terminal was originally a station serving both passenger and freight trains. It opened on April 1, 1915, as the terminal of the Kokura Railway, the predecessor of the Hitahikosan Line. When the Japanese Government Railways purchased the Kokura Railway on May 1, 1943, the station was reestablished on the Kagoshima Main Line as a junction of the two lines, but the station served no passenger trains on the Kagoshima Main Line.

Although the freight-only section of the Hitahikosan Line was closed on October 1, 1962, the terminal continued the freight operation on the Kagoshima Main Line until March 23, 2002 when the new Kitakyūshū Freight Terminal opened. The station has not been officially closed.

References
 

Railway stations in Fukuoka Prefecture
Stations of Japan Freight Railway Company
Railway freight terminals in Japan